Eucithara stromboides is a small sea snail, a marine gastropod mollusk in the family Mangeliidae.

Kilburn (1992) listed this as a possible synonym of Eucithara fusiformis (Reeve, 1846) and designated a lectotype.

Description
The length of the shell attains 14 mm.

The interstices of the ribs show fine revolving striae. The color of the shell is yellowish white.

Distribution
This marine species occurs off the Philippines and Guam, Queensland (Australia), the New Hebrides and the Red Sea and the  Mascarene Basin.

References

  Reeve, L.A. 1846. Monograph of the genus Mangelia. pls 1-8 in Reeve, L.A. (ed). Conchologia Iconica. London : L. Reeve & Co. Vol. 3.
 Crosse, H. 1869. Diagnoses Molluscorum Novae Caledoniae. Journal de Conchyliologie 17: 177-180
 Fischer, P. 1883. Manuel de Conchyliologie et de Paléontologie Conchyliologique ou histoire naturelle des mollusques vivant et fossiles. Paris : F. Savy Vol. 6 513-608 pp.
 Boettger, O. 1895. Die marinen Mollusken der Philippinen. IV. Die Pleurotomiden. Nachrichtsblatt der Deutschen Malakozooligischen Gesellschaft 27(1-2, 3-4): 1-20, 41-63
 Maes, V.O. 1967. The littoral marine mollusks of Cocos-Keeling Islands (Indian Ocean). Proceedings of the Academy of Natural Sciences, Philadelphia 119: 93-217
 H. S. Ladd. 1982. Cenozoic fossil mollusks from Western Pacific Islands; Gastropods (Volutidae through Terebridae). United States Geological Survey Professional Paper 1171:1-100 
 Drivas, J.; Jay, M. (1987). Coquillages de La Réunion et de l'Île Maurice. Collection Les Beautés de la Nature. Delachaux et Niestlé: Neuchâtel. . 159 pp.

External links
  Tucker, J.K. 2004 Catalog of recent and fossil turrids (Mollusca: Gastropoda). Zootaxa 682:1-1295
 
  Hedley, C. 1922. A revision of the Australian Turridae. Records of the Australian Museum 13(6): 213-359, pls 42-56
 Smith, Barry D. "Prosobranch gastropods of Guam." Micronesica 35.36 (2003): 244-270. 

stromboides
Gastropods described in 1846